As of 2005 in Brazil, all firearms are required to be registered with the minimum age for gun ownership being 25. It is generally illegal to carry a gun outside a residence, and a special permit granting the right to do so is granted to certain groups, such as law enforcement officers. For citizens to legally own a gun, they must have a gun license, which costs R$88,00 and pay a fee every ten years to renew the gun register. The registration can be done online or in person with the Federal Police. Until 2008, unregistered guns could be initially registered at no cost for the gun owner, the subsequent referring fee each decade would then apply.

Statistics 
It is estimated that there are around 17 million firearms in Brazil, 9 million of which are unregistered. Some 39,000 people died in 2003 from gun-related injuries nationwide. In 2004, the number was 36,000. Brazil has the second largest arms industry in the Western Hemisphere. Approximately 80% of the weapons manufactured in Brazil are exported, mostly to neighboring countries; many of these weapons are then smuggled back into Brazil.  Some firearms in Brazil come from police and military arsenals, having either been "stolen or sold by corrupt soldiers and officers."

History 
In 2005, a large majority of Brazil's population voted against banning the sale of guns and ammunition to civilians in a referendum. Executive Order  5.123, of 1 July 2004
allowed the Federal Police to confiscate firearms which are not possessed for a valid reason; self-defense was not considered a valid argument.

These measures saw mixed results. Initially, the crime rate dropped, but subsequently rose in later years. 2012 marked the highest rate of gun deaths in 35 years for Brazil, eight years after a ban on carrying handguns in public went into effect, and 2016 saw the worst ever death toll from homicide in Brazil, with 61,619 dead. The death toll rose again in 2017 to 63,880, a 3.7% rise from 2016. 

After the relaxation on gun laws in 2019 by President Jair Bolsonaro, the number of deaths registered by homicide was 19% lower compared to 2018 (51,558), while in 2019 the registered number was 41,635 being the lowest number of homicide deaths since 2007. However, according to experts, this drop in the homicide rate was spurred by varying causes—such as individual states' policies, an aging population, and a truce between rival criminal organizations.

Jair Bolsonaro policy 
Former President Jair Bolsonaro is strongly in favor of repealing the disarmament law and allowing citizens to own and carry guns for defense. On 15 January 2019, Bolsonaro signed the first decree to facilitate the purchase of guns. The decree increases the valid gun ownership period from five to ten years and allows citizens to own up to four firearms. In order to own firearms, a citizen will have to provide proof of the "existence of a safe or a secure location for storage" of the weapon at home. Requirements for possession such as passing training courses and background checks remain, as does the minimum age requirement of 25 years. The decree does not affect restrictions for gun carry, only for possession. On 7 May 2019, Bolsonaro signed an additional decree which allows for rural gun owners to use their guns on their own property; allowing additional arms imports into Brazil; allowing collectors, sports shooters, and hunters to travel from their homes to shootings ranges with their firearms and ammunition; entitling stabilized military with ten or more years experience to bear firearms; and increasing the right to purchase cartridges a year from 50 to 5000 and to 1000 for restricted weapons.

See also 
 IANSA (NGO)
 Taurus (manufacturer)

References

External links 
Companhia Brasileira de Cartuchos (in Portuguese) - Produces ammunition and rifles, such as the Remington Nylon 66; more commonly known under the name Magtech among English speakers.
IMBEL (Indústria de Material Bélico) (in Portuguese) - Produces weaponry, ammunition, and assorted equipment for the Brazilian Army
International Action Network on Small Arms (IANSA)
Taurus official site (in Portuguese) - Firearms manufacturer 
Movimento Viva Brasil  - Gun rights advocacy group

Gun laws in Brazil
Gun politics in Brazil